Anette Wiig Bryn (born 30 January 1964) is a Norwegian politician for the Progress Party.

In her younger days, she was a member of the Young Conservatives.

In 2004, she became city commissioner (byråd) of business and culture in the city government of Oslo.

She served in the position of deputy representative to the Norwegian Parliament from Oslo during the term 2005–2009. She was elected to Oslo city council in 2007, but was exempt due to her position as commissioner.

References

1964 births
Living people
Deputy members of the Storting
Progress Party (Norway) politicians
Politicians from Oslo
Women members of the Storting